Ivan Janjušević (Cyrillic: Иван Jaњушeвић, born 11 July 1986 in Nikšić) is a Montenegrin football goalkeeper. He plays for FK Lovćen in the Montenegrin First League.

International career
Janjušević made a substitute's appearance for the Montenegro national football team in a friendly against Kazakhstan on 27 May 2008. It remained his sole international game.

Honours
Mogren
Montenegrin First League: 2008–09, 2010–11
Montenegrin Cup: 2008

Sutjeska
Montenegrin First League: 2012–13, 2013–14

References

External links

1986 births
Living people
Footballers from Nikšić
Association football goalkeepers
Serbia and Montenegro footballers
Montenegrin footballers
Montenegro international footballers
FK Sutjeska Nikšić players
FK Mogren players
Vasas SC players
Balzan F.C. players
FK Lovćen players
First League of Serbia and Montenegro players
Second League of Serbia and Montenegro players
Montenegrin First League players
Nemzeti Bajnokság I players
Maltese Premier League players
Montenegrin expatriate footballers
Expatriate footballers in Hungary
Montenegrin expatriate sportspeople in Hungary
Expatriate footballers in Malta
Montenegrin expatriate sportspeople in Malta